K29NM-D, virtual and UHF digital channel 29, is a low-powered HSN2-affiliated television station licensed to Spokane, Washington, United States. The station is owned by Ventana Television.

History
The station was initially licensed as K14IF on channel 14 in 1993. K14IF was owned by Clarabelle F. Boone; under her ownership, the station began its affiliation with the Home Shopping Network.

On November 23, 1994, K14IF was sold to West LPTV, Inc.

On June 14, 1996, K14IF was sold to Silver King Communications (later USA Broadcasting), the broadcasting arm of HSN.

On June 3, 2003, K14IF was sold to current owner, Ventana Television, Inc. Programming switched to America's Store.

On December 28, 2005, K14IF became K43GZ.

After America's Store shut down in 2007, K43GZ reverted to HSN.

On November 19, 2012, the station flash cut to digital and changed its call sign to K43GZ-D. In the fall of 2014, programming switched to HSN's alternate feed, HSN2, apparently in response to the prime HSN feed airing on a subchannel of Ion Television affiliate KGPX (channel 34).

On February 1, 2019, the station was licensed to move its digital signal to channel 29, changing its call sign to K29NM-D.

Digital channels
The station's signal is multiplexed:

References

External links

Television channels and stations established in 1993
Low-power television stations in the United States
29NM-D
1993 establishments in Washington (state)